Kareli is a city and a Municipality in the Indian state of Madhya Pradesh.
Kareli is financial capital of the district Narsinghpur. It is well connected by transportation. Near Kareli, an ancient fair called Barman Mela is organised every year in the month of January on the bank of the river Narmada.
There are many historic and religious places in Kareli like Deepeshwar Temple Barman, Chougan Fort. India's longest Road NH-44 (Old Name-NH-26) passes through Kareli and also connected to almost every part of the country by rail network.
Before the construction of the Bina-Katni branch of the Indian Midland Railway, the metaled road from Saugor crossing the Nerbudda at Barmhan brought the bulk of the produce of the Sagar District to Kareli station. The trade of Kareli has now considerably declined, but it is still the exporting station for the southern parts of the Rehli tahsil of Sagar and the north of Narsinghpur. A cotton-ginning factory, the property of Raja Gokul Das, was opened in 1904. This is the nearest rail station and market for towns of Sagar district.

Local administration

Kareli was formerly a municipality but its municipal constitution was abolished in 1897, and the provisions of the Village Sanitation Act were introduced.

Local governance
There are 15 wards in Kareli municipality and the Nagar Palika Adhyaksha (Mayor) is the chief of the municipality.

Civil administration
There are Sub-Divisional Magistrate and Tehsildar office.

Law and order
Kareli Police Station/ Thana with the office of the Deputy Superintendent
of Police (DSP).
In addition, nearest Railway police Chowky of Railway Protection Force is at Kareli.

Judiciary
There is an office of the Civil Judge.

Geography

Main villages: Dilheri, Umariya, Amgoan, Mohad, Amhenta, Jowa, Bhugwara, Pipariya, and Khiriya.

Demographics

Kareli is a Municipality city in the district of Narsimhapur, Madhya Pradesh. Kareli city is divided into 15 wards for which elections are held every five years. The Kareli Municipality has population of 29,929 of which 15,592 are males while 14,337 are females as per report released by Census India 2011.

Population of Children with age of 0-6 is 3415 which is 11.41% of total population of Kareli (M). In Kareli Municipality, Female Sex Ratio is of 920 against state average of 931. Moreover, the child sex ratio in Kareli is around 873 compared to the Madhya Pradesh state average of 918. Literacy rate of Kareli is 86.28% higher than state average of 69.32%. In Kareli, male literacy is around 90.60% while female literacy rate is 81.62%.

Kareli Municipality has total administration over 6,490 houses to which it supplies basic amenities like water and sewerage. It is also authorized to build roads within municipality limits and impose taxes on properties coming under its jurisdiction.

Population rise of Kareli as a municipality is 18,791 in 1991, 25,043 in 2001 and 29,929 in 2011.

The sub district is home to about 1.6 lakh people, among them about 83 thousand (52%) are male and about 77 thousand (48%) are female. 72% of the whole population are from general caste, 15% are from schedule caste and 13% are schedule tribes. Child (aged under 6 years) population of Kareli tahsil is 13%, among them 52% are boys and 48% are girls. There are about 37 thousand households in the sub district and an average 4 persons live in every family.
The majority of the population, nearly 76% (about 1.2 lakh) live in Kareli Sub District rural part and 24% (about 38 thousand) population live in the Kareli Sub District urban part.

Agriculture

Kareli is biggest Gur Mandi (Market of JAGGERY) of Madhya Pradesh. Sugar industry has seen a significant progress in the last decade.
It is also well known for its fertile land. The black soil is suited for any kind of cultivation and there are adequate irrigation facilities. It is famous for its rich agricultural production. It is situated in the upper part of Narmada Valley, which is of much important for agriculture. The production of grains is more than the local requirement. For agriculture both old and new techniques are equally in practice. For old equipment, there are ploughs, bullock carts, bakhar, hansiya, and various types of knives and khurpi. In new methods or techniques, there are: thrashers, tractors, harvesters, electric pumps and sprinklers. Along with these better quality seeds and the best quality pesticides are used.

Crops

Mainly crops are cultivated in two seasons, Rabi and Kharif. This is based on the climate and the conditions prevails in the district by the time.

During Rabi, crops are cultivated in October–November, with cutting in April/May. The major Rabi crops are wheat, pulses, peas, alsi and masoor.

During Kharif, the farming period is June–July with cutting in October. The major Kharif crops are: paddy, jowar, bajra, makka, kondo and kutki.

The major commercial crops are soybeans and sugarcane, which is produced in large quantity and a major source of income. Soybean is used for oil extraction, and sugarcane for sugar and gur.

Industry

Being an agricultural land, large industries are rare in the area. Also most of the industrial institutions are agricultural-oriented.

Gur/sugar from sugarcane: In many places, gur has been prepared from sugarcane all over the district.

Daal Mills: Tuwar (arhar) pulses are prepared here.

Oil Mills: There are many oil mills where soybean and groundnut are extracted.

There are number of oil franchises like Madhuri, Kriti, Satyam pvt.ltd.

Other industries include cement pipes, paper mills, plastic and rubber, leather goods, earthen utensils and pots. Poultry farms, goat farming, and fish farming.

Climate
The climate is generally pleasant except in summer. Waves move slowly except during the south-west monsoon. May is the hottest month of the year. It is very excessively hot during summer, and in the end of this season dust storms come. When the monsoon arrives, the hygrometer mercury goes very low. The 90% rainfall is observed during monsoon months only; i.e., June to September. Sometimes cold waves also occur, and heavy fog is also observed.

Tourism

Bramhan Ghat

Lord Brahma's Yagya Shala, Deepeshwar Temple, Rani Durgawati Temple, Elephant Gate and Varahas Statue are places of tourist interest there. The Narmada River flows in seven strains. It flows on the occasions of Makar Sankranti to Basant Panchami. Mela has been arranged in which District Administration also takes part. Also organized are different stalls of the district Govt. Depot. This exhibition has the display of the Agriculture Depot, co-operative, education, and health. Different beneficial schemes information and achievement have shown throes which people get benefit out of this exhibition, and also avail the district out of 20% on different sale items.

Fort of Chougan/Chauragharh

The station is of a very ancient time and not much remains of this fort which was built by Genha dynasty's King, Gond, Sangram Shah in the 15th century. One Narsinghpur district near Barheta village Nonia is also a place having archaeological importance. Here six large statues are inside Parkota, which is known as Pandav, math statue.

Literature
Kalidas Baghel (श्री प्रेम माते) is Senior Poet and well known philosopher of Kareli.

By Airways 
Nearest airport is Dumna Airport (Jabalpur Airport), Jabalpur (117 km) and Raja Bhoj Airport, Bhopal (220 km).

By Roadways
Kareli is located on the NH 44 North-South Corridor (Srinagar-Kanyakumari) and MP-SH 22 (Sandalpur–Hoshangabad-Piparia-Narsinghpur–Jabalpur-Dindori) The buses from and to Jabalpur, Bhopal, Indore, Chhindwara, Narsinghpur, Gadarwara, Sagar, Pipariya, Hoshangabad are available.

By Railways
Kareli has very well connectivity with the rail network of India, located between Mumbai-Allahabad-Kolkata Rail Route, Many trains running between Mumbai, Jabalpur, Allahabad has stoppage at Kareli Railway Station.

Kareli railway station is under the Jabalpur railway division of West Central Railway zone. In 1869–71, brothers, Ladhha Bharmal Chawda and Ramji Bharmal Chawda of Chandiya were the main contractors for Great Indian Peninsula Railway. The railway built 153 miles long railway track from Itarsi to Jabalpur. The station of Kareli along with Bagra Tawa, Sohagpur, Pipariya, Gadarwara were also built by them.
With completion of this line on 7 March 1870, the Great Indian Peninsula Railway got connected with East Indian Railway network with Jubbulpore (Jabalpur) as the Junction.

Kareli has very well connected by Indian Railways, with a facility of daily running trains for New Delhi, Mumbai, Kolkata, Bhopal, Indore, Jabalpur, Itarsi, Gwalior, Allahabad, Varanasi, Patna and several other places in India.
The nearest junction is Itarsi (145 km), one of the biggest junctions in India and several trains pass from this station (Itarsi) while going from north to south or east to west and another nearest is junction Jabalpur (100 km) which is also the zonal office of the west central rail zone.

References

Cities and towns in Narsinghpur district